Meenakshi Patil is an Indian politician who served as Member of Maharashtra Legislative Assembly from Alibag Assembly constituency from 1995 to 1999, 1999 to 2004 and 2009 to 2014.

Personal life 
She was born in 1947. She is the niece of Datta Narayan Patil, former opposition leader. She is from Peasants and Workers Party of India.

References 

Maharashtra MLAs 1995–1999
1947 births
Women members of the Maharashtra Legislative Assembly
Maharashtra MLAs 1999–2004
Maharashtra MLAs 2009–2014
Peasants and Workers Party of India politicians
Living people
People from Raigad district
21st-century Indian women politicians